Emmanuel Guevara (born 2 February 1902, date of death unknown) was a Mexican footballer. He played in one match for the Mexico national football team in 1928. He was also part of Mexico's squad for the football tournament at the 1928 Summer Olympics.

References

External links
 

1902 births
Year of death missing
Mexican footballers
Mexico international footballers
Place of birth missing
Association football midfielders
Footballers at the 1928 Summer Olympics
Olympic footballers of Mexico